Azhagiyasingar temple may refer to several places:

 Azhagiyasingar temple, Thiruvali close to Sirkazhi in Nagapattinam district
 Azhagiyasingar temple, Kanchipuram in Kanchipuram (also called Tiruvelukkai)